Astoria is a neighborhood in the western portion of the New York City borough of Queens. Astoria is bounded by the East River and is adjacent to three other Queens neighborhoods: Long Island City to the southwest, Sunnyside to the southeast, and Woodside to the east.  , Astoria has an estimated population of 95,446.

The area was originally called Hallet's (or Hallett's) Cove after its first landowner William Hallet, who settled there in 1652 with his wife, Elizabeth Fones. Hallet's Cove was incorporated on April 12, 1839, and was later renamed for John Jacob Astor, then the wealthiest man in the United States, in order to persuade him to invest in the area. During the second half of the 19th century, economic and commercial growth brought increased immigration. Astoria and several other surrounding villages were incorporated into Long Island City in 1870, which in turn was incorporated into the City of Greater New York in 1898. Commercial activity continued through the 20th century, with the area being a center for filmmaking and industry.

Astoria is located in Queens Community District 1 and its ZIP Codes are 11101, 11102, 11103, 11105, and 11106. It is patrolled by the New York City Police Department's 114th Precinct. Politically, Astoria is represented by the New York City Council's 22nd and 26th Districts.

History

Early settlement 
The area now known as Astoria was originally called Hallet's Cove (also spelled Hallett's Cove), after its first landowner William Hallet, (or Hallett) who settled there in 1652 with his wife, Elizabeth Fones. The peninsula was bordered to the north by Hell Gate, to the west by the East River, and the south by Sunswick Creek. Hallet bought the land in 1664 from two native chiefs named Shawestcont and Erramorhar.

Beginning in the early 19th century, affluent New Yorkers constructed large residences around 12th and 14th Streets, an area that later became known as Astoria Village (now Old Astoria). Hallet's Cove, incorporated on April 12, 1839 and previously founded by fur merchant Stephen A. Halsey, was a noted recreational destination and resort for Manhattan's wealthy.

The area was renamed for John Jacob Astor, then the wealthiest man in the United States with a net worth of more than $40 million, in order to persuade him to invest in the neighborhood. He only invested $500, but the name stayed nonetheless, as a bitter battle over naming the village finally was won by Astor's supporters and friends. From Astor's summer home in Yorkville, Manhattan—on what is now East 87th Street near York Avenue—he could see across the East River the new Long Island village named in his honor. Astor, however, never actually set foot in Astoria.

Economic development 
During the second half of the 19th century, economic and commercial growth brought increased immigration from German settlers, mostly furniture and cabinet makers. One such settler was Heinrich Engelhard Steinweg, patriarch of the Steinway family who founded the piano company Steinway & Sons in 1853, which today is a worldwide piano company. Later on, the Steinways built a sawmill and foundry, as well as a streetcar line. The family eventually established Steinway Village for their workers, a company town that provided school instruction in German as well as English. Part of the motivation for locating the Steinway factory in Queens was to keep the workers isolated from the ferment of labor organizing and radicalism occurring in other parts of New York, notably the Lower East Side.

Astoria and several other surrounding villages, including Steinway, were incorporated into Long Island City in 1870. Long Island City remained an independent municipality until it was incorporated into the City of Greater New York in 1898. The area's farms were turned into housing tracts and street grids to accommodate the growing number of residents.

Astoria also figured prominently in early American filmmaking as one of its initial centers. That heritage is preserved today by the Museum of the Moving Image and Kaufman Astoria Studios.

Demographics

For census purposes, the New York City government classifies Astoria as part of three neighborhood tabulation areas: Steinway (north of Grand Central Parkway), Old Astoria (north of 31st Avenue and approximately west of 31st Street), and Astoria (in the remaining area approximately north of Northern Boulevard / 36th Avenue and approximately west of Hobart Street / 50th Street). Based on data from the 2010 United States Census, the combined population of these areas was 154,141, a decrease of 17,427 (10.2%) from the 171,568 counted in 2000.

The racial makeup of the neighborhood was 52.2% (80,533) Non-Hispanic White, 4.7% (7,204) black, 0.2% (250) Native American, 14.3% (22,100) Asian, 0.0% (70) Pacific Islander, 1.0% (1,532) from other races, and 2.1% (3,238) from two or more races. Hispanic or Latino of any race were 25.4% (39,214) of the population. The Astoria and Old Astoria tabulation areas had greater Hispanic / Latino and Asian populations, and the Old Astoria area specifically had a greater Black population.

The racial and ethnic composition of Astoria changed significantly from 2000 to 2010. The most significant changes were the decrease in the Other population by 64% (8,919) and the decrease in the Hispanic / Latino population by 13% (5,705). The White majority also decreased by 2% (1,699), while the Asian minority decreased by 5% (1,120), and the change in the small Black population rounded to 0% (11). Taking into account the three census tabulation areas, the White and Asian populations both actually increased in Old Astoria, but decreased enough in Astoria and Steinway to cause an overall decrease; on the other hand, the Black population decreased in Old Astoria and increased equivalently in the other regions. The decreases in the Hispanic / Latino population and in racial groups, however, were relatively even across the three areas.

The entirety of Queens Community District 1, which includes Astoria and parts of Long Island City, is bounded to the east approximately by the Brooklyn-Queens Expressway and 81st Street, and to the south approximately by Queens Plaza and Northern Boulevard. It had 199,969 residents according to NYC Health's 2018 Community Health Profile, with an average life expectancy of 83.4 years. This is higher than the median life expectancy of 81.2 for all New York City neighborhoods. Most inhabitants are middle-aged adults and youth: 16% are between the ages of 0–17, 41% between 25 and 44, and 22% between 45 and 64. The ratio of college-aged and elderly residents was lower, at 10% and 12% respectively.

, the median household income in Community District 1 was $67,444. In 2018, an estimated 18% of Astoria residents lived in poverty, compared to 19% in all of Queens and 20% in all of New York City. Around 8% of residents were unemployed, compared to 8% in Queens and 9% in New York City. Rent burden, or the percentage of residents who have difficulty paying their rent, is 47% in Astoria, slightly lower than the boroughwide and citywide rates of 53% and 51% respectively. Based on this calculation, Community District 1 is considered to be gentrifying: according to the Community Health Profile, the district was low-income in 1990 and has seen above-median rent growth up to 2010.

Ethnic groups

Early populations 
Astoria was first settled by the Dutch, English, and Germans in the 17th century. Many Irish settled in the area during the waves of Irish immigration into New York City during the 19th and early 20th centuries.

Italians were the next significant immigrants in Astoria, and numerous Italian restaurants, delis, bakeries, and pizza shops are found throughout Astoria, particularly in the Ditmars Boulevard area.

Jews were also a significant ethnic and religious group. The Astoria Center of Israel, which is listed on the National Register of Historic Places, was built in 1925 after outgrowing the former Congregation Mishkan Israel, which was built in 1904.

Later populations 
The 1960s saw a large increase of Greeks, and after 1974, there was an influx of Cypriots. This cultural imprint can be seen in the numerous Greek restaurants, tavernas, bakeries, and cafes, as well as several Greek Orthodox churches. In the late 1960s, a 'Greek Town' neighborhood coalesced in Astoria. From 1960s to 1980s the number of Greeks constantly increased. While the population of Greeks in Astoria was 22,579 in 1980, it dropped to 18,127 by 1990 due to decreased immigration and lower birth rates. During the 2000s, the Greek immigration dropped again. During the 2010s and 2020s economic issues in Greece caused a resurgence of Greek immigration. Greek organizations in the area include the Hellenic American Action Committee (HANAC) and the Federation of Hellenic Societies of Greater New York.

About 20,000 Maltese also live in Astoria, and although this population has steadily been emigrating from the area, there are still many Maltese, supported by the Maltese Center of New York.

Beginning in the mid-1970s, the neighborhood's Muslim population grew from earlier immigrants from Lebanon to also include people from Kosovo, Albania, Bosnia-Herzegovina, Montenegro, Egypt, Syria, Yemen, Tunisia, Morocco, and Algeria. In the 1990s, Steinway Street between 28th Avenue and Astoria Boulevard saw the establishment of many Arabic shops, restaurants, and cafes, which is unofficially called "Little Egypt", due to the number of Arabs residing there and the mostly Egyptian shops and lounges there.

Croatians from Croatia and Bosnia-Herzegovina have been numerous since the 1960s and their numbers continue to grow. New populations of South American and Balkan peoples have seen significant growth since the early 1990s, including a large population of Brazilians, who reside in the 36th Avenue area. Albanians, Bulgarians, Serbs, and Bosnians have also shown a rise in numbers. Many Spanish Americans live in Astoria, with most of them being of Galician heritage from Northwestern Spain; this community is supported by the Casa Galicia (Galicia House) and the Circulo Español (Spanish Circle).

At one time, many Bangladeshi Americans settled in Astoria, but by 2001, many of them had moved to Metro Detroit. A survey of an Astoria-area Bengali language newspaper estimated that, in an 18-month period until March 2001, 8,000 Bangladeshi people moved to the Detroit area. However, as of 2010, the Bangladeshi American community in Astoria has been increasing.

By the early 21st century, Astoria was one of the most ethnically diverse neighborhoods in Queens, with people from around 100 countries residing there . Population losses in Queens were particularly high in immigrant neighborhoods such as Astoria, which suffered the greatest population loss in the city, losing more than 10,000 residents between the years 2000 and 2010.

Geography

There is some debate as to what constitutes the geographic boundaries of Astoria. The neighborhood was part of Long Island City prior to the latter's incorporation into the City of Greater New York in 1898.

The area south of Astoria was called Ravenswood, and traditionally, Broadway was considered the border between the two. Today, however, many residents and businesses south of Broadway identify themselves as Astorians for convenience or status, since Long Island City has historically been considered an industrial area, and Ravenswood is now mostly a low-income neighborhood. Some of the thoroughfares have lent their names to unofficial terms for the areas they serve. For instance, the eastern end of Astoria, with Steinway Street as its main thoroughfare, is sometimes referred to simply as "Steinway", and the northern end around Ditmars Boulevard is sometimes referred to as "Ditmars", with their convergence point bearing the neighborhood name "Ditmars-Steinway". Banners displayed on lamp posts along 30th Avenue refer to it as "the Heart of Astoria".

Ravenswood

Ravenswood is the name for the strip of land bordering the East River and Long Island City, and is part of Astoria. It was situated around Sunswick Creek, which drained into the East River at the current location of Socrates Sculpture Park.

The land was acquired in 1814 by Col. George Gibbs, a businessman from New York City who developed it. Gibbs died in 1833, and the land was divided into nine parcels by three developers. From 1848, there were several mansions built on this land, but the high class housing did not survive. The spring of 1853 brought the opening of a post office of its own and country store "run by Messrs. Moore & Luyster, and Mr. Samuel H. Moore of that firm received the appointment of postmaster, handling the mails in a corner of the store."

Ravenswood, unlike Astoria, never became a village; there was no disposition at any time to become independent as there was insufficient population or commercial activity to justify such a move. Ravenswood remained an exclusive hamlet within the Town of Newtown until its absorption with the Village of Astoria and the hamlets of Hunters Point, Blissville, Sunnyside, Dutch Kills, Steinway, Bowery Bay and Middleton in Newtown Township into Long Island City in 1870. In 1870, Ravenswood, along with several other hamlets and the Village of Astoria, merged to form Long Island City.

In 1875, the first commercial buildings were erected, and the mansions were converted into offices and boarding houses. In 1879, the Long Island Terra Cotta Company was established in Ravenswood, by Rudolph Franke. By 1900, Ravenswood was heavily commercial, and remains so to this day. However, the name has retained its residential character through the New York City Housing Authority project that was built in 1949 to 1951 with this name between 34th and 36th Avenues, and 12th and 24th Streets.

The name also identifies the large electric power station established along the shore of the East River, just south of the Roosevelt Island Bridge. The Ravenswood Generating Station which includes Ravenswood No. 3 or "Big Allis", was built by Con Edison in 1963–65 but, due to deregulation, has subsequently been owned by KeySpan, National Grid, and TransCanada. The power plant can generate approximately 2,500 megawatts of power, which is about 20 percent of New York City's electricity demand.

Ditmars

Ditmars is a middle class section of Astoria bounded by Bowery Bay to the north, 31st Street and the Steinway subsection to the east, 23rd Avenue to the south, and the East River to the west. The adjacent Steinway neighborhood was largely developed as a company town by the Steinway & Sons piano company, and included houses and public facilities that were also available to non-employees. However, the Ditmars neighborhood was not included in the Steinway & Sons company housing and related facilities project. The neighborhood takes its name from Ditmars Boulevard which was named in honor of Abram Ditmars, the first mayor of Long Island City, New York, elected in 1870 (the city became a mere neighborhood when Queens became a part of Greater New York). His ancestors were German immigrants who settled in the Dutch Kills area in the 1600s.

Astoria Heights
Astoria Heights, or Upper Ditmars, is bounded by Hazen Street to the west, La Guardia Airport to the east, Bowery Bay to the north, and Astoria Boulevard and the Grand Central Parkway to the south. It is mostly a quiet middle class neighborhood of one- and two-family private homes.

The Riker-Lent Homestead is near the north end of Astoria Heights at 78-03 19th Road. Built around 1655 by Abraham Riker under a patent from Nieuw Nederland's last governor, Peter Stuyvesant, it is believed to be the oldest remaining dwelling in New York City still used as a residence. There is an adjacent family cemetery. The Smiths, who bought the house in 1975, have been restoring it for many years. The annual public tour was given usually in mid-September by the owners for the benefit of a local historical society, but has since ceased to occur.

Before Prohibition, there were dance halls, picnic areas, and amusement park rides at North Beach.

Ragtime composer Scott Joplin is buried across the Grand Central Parkway at St. Michael's Cemetery, which occasionally holds ragtime concerts.

The Rikers Island Bridge to New York City's main prison, Rikers Island, runs from the north end of Hazen Street. Technically, Rikers Island is in the Bronx since New York City took it over from Long Island City in 1884, after it had annexed the South Bronx but before it consolidated Queens. However, like Astoria Heights, Rikers Island gets its mail from the East Elmhurst (ZIP Code 11370) station of the Flushing Post Office.

Places of interest

Museum of the Moving Image in the former Kaufman Astoria Studios building
Isamu Noguchi Museum
Socrates Sculpture Park
Astoria Park along the East River, is Astoria's largest park and also contains the largest of New York City's public pools (at 330 feet long) which was also the former site of the 1936 and 1964 U.S. Olympic trials.
 The Hell Gate Bridge and New York Connecting Railroad/Northeast Corridor viaduct rise high above Astoria.
 The oldest beer garden in New York City, Bohemian Hall, was founded in 1910 when Astoria was largely Irish, Italian, Bohemian (Czech), and Slovak.
 The Greater Astoria Historical Society in the historic Quinn Memorial Building on the corner of Broadway and 36th Street serves as a valuable historical resource and provides tourist information.
 St. Michael's Cemetery on Astoria Boulevard is the burial place of composer and pianist Scott Joplin and gangster Frank Costello.
Steinway & Sons piano factory located at 1 Steinway Place (not to be confused with Steinway Street) has been in operation in Astoria since the late 19th century and represents a legacy of award-winning craftsmanship, arts patronage, and the once vibrant, stand-alone Steinway Village. Limited tours of the factory are available.
 The Modern Art Foundry, a foundry, is located in Astoria.
 In addition to Bohemian Hall, the Astoria Center of Israel, Paramount Studios Complex, Sohmer and Company Piano Factory, Steinway Mansion, and Trinity Lutheran Church are listed on the National Register of Historic Places.
 The 1938 birthplace of xerography, and thus Xerox, by Chester Carlson at 32-05 37th Street.

Police and crime
Astoria is patrolled by the 114th Precinct of the NYPD, located at 34-16 Astoria Boulevard. The precinct also covers parts of Long Island City and Woodside. The 114th Precinct has a lower crime rate than in the 1990s, with crimes across all categories having decreased by 83.9% between 1990 and 2019. The precinct reported 2 murders, 34 rapes, 184 robberies, 364 felony assaults, 196 burglaries, 782 grand larcenies, and 136 grand larcenies auto in 2019.

, Queens Community District 1 has a non-fatal assault hospitalization rate of 56 per 100,000 people, compared to the boroughwide rate of 37 per 100,000 and the citywide rate of 59 per 100,000. Its incarceration rate is 277 per 100,000 people, compared to the boroughwide rate of 315 per 100,000 and the citywide rate of 425 per 100,000.

Of the five major violent felonies (murder, rape, felony assault, robbery, and burglary), the 114th Precinct had a rate of 385 crimes per 100,000 residents in 2019, compared to the boroughwide average of 424 crimes per 100,000 and the citywide average of 572 crimes per 100,000.

Fire safety 

Astoria is served by four New York City Fire Department (FDNY) fire stations:
 Engine Company 263/Ladder Company 117 – 42-08 Astoria Boulevard South
 Engine Company 262/Decon 2 – 30-89 21st Street
 Engine Company 260 – 11-15 37th Avenue
 Battalion 49/Engine Company 312 – 22-63 35th Street

Health 
, preterm births and births to teenage mothers are less common in Astoria than in other places citywide. In Astoria, there were 84 preterm births per 1,000 live births (compared to 87 per 1,000 citywide), and 15.1 births to teenage mothers per 1,000 live births (compared to 19.3 per 1,000 citywide). Astoria has a relatively average population of residents who are uninsured. In 2018, this population of uninsured residents was estimated to be 12%, which is equal to the citywide rate of 12%.

Nineteen percent of Astoria residents are smokers, which is higher than the city average of 14% of residents being smokers. In Astoria, 19% of residents are obese, 11% are diabetic, and 29% have high blood pressure—compared to the citywide averages of 24%, 11%, and 28% respectively. In addition, 22% of children are obese, compared to the citywide average of 20%.

Eighty-nine percent of residents eat some fruits and vegetables every day, which is higher than the city's average of 87%. In 2018, 79% of residents described their health as "good," "very good," or "excellent," about the same as the city's average of 78%. For every supermarket in Astoria, there are 10 bodegas.

Astoria is served by the Mount Sinai Hospital of Queens.

Post offices and ZIP Codes
Astoria is covered by ZIP Codes 11102 between 37th Avenue and Grand Central Parkway, 11105 north of Grand Central Parkway, 11106 between 31st and 37th Avenues west of 37th Street, 11101 south of 37th Avenue, and 11103 east of 37th Street. The United States Post Office operates five locations nearby:

 Astoria Station – 30-11 21st Street
 Broadway Station – 21-17 Broadway
 Grand Station – 45-08 30th Avenue
 Steinway Station – 43-04 Broadway
 Woolsey Station – 22-68 31st Street

Education 
Astoria generally has a higher ratio of college-educated residents than the rest of the city . Half of residents (50%) have a college education or higher, while 16% have less than a high school education and 33% are high school graduates or have some college education. By contrast, 39% of Queens residents and 43% of city residents have a college education or higher. The percentage of Astoria students excelling in math rose from 43 percent in 2000 to 65 percent in 2011, and reading achievement rose from 47% to 49% during the same time period.

Astoria's rate of elementary school student absenteeism is about equal to the rest of New York City. In Astoria, 19% of elementary school students missed twenty or more days per school year, less than the citywide average of 20%. Additionally, 78% of high school students in Astoria graduate on time, more than the citywide average of 75%.

Schools
The New York City Department of Education operates Astoria's public schools.

Astoria also has several private schools, many of which offer parochial education:
 Immaculate Conception Catholic Academy (Nursery – 8th Grade) (21-63 29th Street)
 Les Enfants Montessori School (29-21 Newtown Avenue)
 Our Lady of Mt. Carmel School (23-15 Newtown Avenue)
 Queens Lutheran School (31-20 37th Street)
 St. Catherine and St. George School (22-30 33rd Street)
 St. Demetrios Astoria School (30-03 30th Drive)
 St. Francis of Assisi School (21-18 46th Street)
 St. John's Preparatory School (21-21 Crescent Street)
 St. Joseph's Academy (Pre-K – 8th) (28-46 44th Street)
 Most Precious Blood School (Pre-K – 8th) (32-52 37th Street)
 El-Ber Islamic School (25-42 49th Street)
 The 30th Avenue School (28-37 29th Street)
 P.S. 70 30-44 43rd St
 Horace Greeley I.S.10 30-44 43rd St
 P.S./M.S. 122Q. Mamie Fay (Pre-K – 8th) (21-21 Ditmars Blvd.)

Libraries

Queens Public Library operates three branches within Astoria:
 The Astoria branch at 14-01 Astoria Boulevard
 The Broadway branch at 40-20 Broadway
 The Steinway branch at 21-45 31st Street

Transportation

Public transportation

The following New York City Subway stations serve Astoria:
 
 
 
 
 
 
 
 

The following MTA Regional Bus Operations bus routes serve Astoria:
 Q18: to Maspeth via 30th Avenue
 Q19: to  via Astoria Boulevard
 Q101: to East Midtown, Manhattan or Astoria Heights via Steinway Street and 20th Avenue
 Q102: to Roosevelt Island via 31st Street and 30th Avenue
 Q103: to  via Vernon Boulevard
 Q104: to  via Broadway
 M60 SBS: to Morningside Heights, Manhattan, or LaGuardia Airport via Astoria Boulevard

Astoria has been served by NYC Ferry's Astoria route since August 2017.

There are plans to build the Brooklyn–Queens Connector (BQX), a light rail system that would run along the waterfront from Red Hook in Brooklyn to Astoria. However, the system is projected to cost $2.7 billion, and the projected opening has been delayed until at least 2029.

Roads
The primary streets running north–south are Vernon Boulevard along the East River; 21st Street, a major traffic artery with a mix of residential, commercial and industrial areas; 31st Street; and Steinway Street (named for Heinrich Engelhard Steinweg (later Henry E. Steinway), founder of the piano company Steinway & Sons), a major commercial street with many retail stores.

Fourteen percent of roads in Astoria have bike lanes, higher than the rate in the city overall. Bicycle lanes, built as part of the city's bike lane system, include marked space along Vernon Boulevard, 20th Avenue, 21st Street, 34th and 36th Avenues, and access to protected paths crossing the Triborough Bridge onto Randalls and Wards Islands. Riders may also engage in more scenic biking along short sections of Shore Blvd. bordering both Astoria Park and Ralph DeMarco Park, a span that is occasionally closed to motor vehicle traffic during events.

Notable people

Born in Astoria

 Ted Alexandro (born 1969), comedian
 Iris Apfel (born 1921), businesswoman and style icon
 Joe Bastianich (born 1968), chef and restaurant owner
 Tony Bennett (born 1926), Grammy-winning singer
 Jay Black (1938–2021), lead singer of the band Jay and the Americans.
 Frank Bonsangue, actor and television personality
 Eddie Bracken (1915–2002), actor
 Hillary Brooke (born Beatrice Peterson, 1914–1999), actress and Lou Costello's love interest on The Abbott and Costello Show
 The Cadillac Man, author, Land of the Lost Souls: My Life on the Streets
 Maria Callas (1923–1977), opera singer (early childhood)
 Robert Davi (born 1953), actor, who has appeared in The Goonies, Die Hard, and Licence to Kill
 John Frusciante (born 1970), guitarist for Red Hot Chili Peppers.
 Ed Gardner (1901–1963), actor, best known for his work on Duffy's Tavern
 Anthony Giacchino (born 1969), filmmaker and producer
 George Gibbs (1815–1873), geologist who contributed to the study of the languages of the indigenous peoples of Washington Territory
 Jack Kelly (1927–1992), actor, mayor of Huntington Beach, California
 Cyndi Lauper (born 1953), singer, songwriter, actress, LGBT activist
 Billy Loes (1929–2010), right-handed pitcher who spent eleven seasons in Major League Baseball with the Brooklyn Dodgers, Baltimore Orioles and San Francisco Giants.
 Melanie Martinez (born 1995), singer-songwriter, appeared on The Voice (2012)
 Patrick McGoohan (1928–2009), actor
 Chris Megaloudis (born 1984), soccer player for the Puerto Rico national football team
 Ethel Merman (1908–1984), Broadway actress and singer
 Eric Metaxas (born 1963), author, founder of "Socrates in the City"
 Marilyn Milian (born 1961), judge on television series The People's Court
 Dito Montiel (born 1965), author, screenwriter, director and musician
 Nicole and Natalie Albino, of the musical duo Nina Sky
 Al Oerter (1936–2007), Olympic discus throw four-time gold medalist
 Melanie Safka (born 1947), singer-songwriter
 Joe Santagato (born 1992), Youtuber and entertainer
 Franz Schurmann (1926–2010), Cold War-era expert on the People's Republic of China
 Dee Snider (born 1955) singer of rock band Twisted Sister
 Christopher Walken (born 1943), actor
 Gordon Willis (1931–2014), Academy Award-winning-cinematographer

Raised in or moved to Astoria
 Alvey A. Adee (1842–1924), acting U.S. Secretary of State
 Lidia Bastianich, (born 1947) celebrity chef, TV host, cookbook author and restaurateur
 Panayiota Bertzikis (born 1981), author, public speaker, and women's rights activist.
 Chester Carlson (1906–1968), inventor of xerography and co-founder of Xerox
 Alex Corbisiero (born 1988), professional rugby union player
 Kambri Crews, author and storyteller
 Jesse Eisenberg (born 1983), actor.
 Christian Finnegan, comedian and actor
 Whitey Ford (1928–2020), New York Yankees pitcher
 George Gemünder (1816–1899), German-born American violin maker who pioneered the construction of quality violins in the United States.
 Shane Gillis (born 1987), comedian and podcast host.
 Chamique Holdsclaw (born 1977), basketball player
 Anik Khan (born 1989), Bangladeshi-American hip-hop artist
 Nomiki Konst (born 1984), journalist
 George Maharis (born 1928), actor and singer, best known for his work on Route 66
 John H. Meier (born 1933), financier and former business associate of Howard Hughes, also involved with Watergate
 Nicole Petallides (born 1971), Fox Business reporter
 Henrietta Rodman (1877–1923), feminist and educator
 Larry Sharpe (born 1968), businessman and politician

Grave sites
Additionally, Astoria is the final resting place of New York City mobster Frank Costello as well as ragtime composer and musician Scott Joplin. Both Costello and Joplin are interred at St. Michael's Cemetery. The cemetery hosts annual public events and concerts to celebrate Joplin's musical legacy, including a Joplin retrospective.

In popular culture

The neighborhood has often been featured in various media; in film and television, the area is either featured as Astoria or as a setting for another location in New York City.

Film
 In the film Joe (1970), Peter Boyle's character is a "hippie-hating hardhat" who lives in Astoria.
 The 1973 film adaptation of the John-Michael Tebelak stage musical Godspell includes multiple images of characters beneath the supports for The Hell Gate Bridge, or East River Arch Bridge, as seen from Randall's Island, both while the plot unfolds as well as during visual montages that take place in such numbers as Day by Day and We Beseech Thee. The view of the bridge is similar to those found in Astoria Park and Astoria can occasionally be viewed in the background of shots facing east.
 Serpico (1973), with Al Pacino, had several scenes filmed in Astoria. For example, the elevated train stop at Ditmars Boulevard was the location for a chase scene, and Serpico has a clandestine meeting in Astoria Park under the Hell Gate Bridge.
 King Kong (1976) has a scene in Astoria, at Astoria Boulevard and 31st Street, where the two main characters board the RR train at the Astoria Boulevard station on the BMT Astoria Line.
 The 1982 film version of Tempest, starring John Cassavetes, had scenes shot at the cafes on 23rd Ave off 31st St.
 Five Corners (1987), starring Jodie Foster, was shot in Astoria.
 The movie Queens Logic (1991) was filmed all around Astoria and features an Astoria landmark—the Hell Gate Bridge. One of the screenwriters, Tony Spiridakis, has roots in Astoria.
 The Robert De Niro film A Bronx Tale (1993) was set in the Bronx, but most of the exterior scenes were filmed in Astoria as well as the nearby neighborhood of Woodside. The high school featured in the film is William Cullen Bryant High School on 31st Avenue, the church used in the film is St. Joseph's on 30th Avenue, and the funeral parlor scenes were shot from a funeral home on 30th Ave, across the street from St. Joseph's Church.
 The independent film Girls Town (1996) shows scenes shot in Astoria Park.
 Woody Allen's film Hollywood Ending (2002) had scenes shot in the neighborhood surrounding the Kaufman Astoria stages.
 A Guide to Recognizing Your Saints (2006), starring Robert Downey Jr. and Shia LaBeouf, and adapted from Dito Montiel's 2001 memoir about the filmmaker's experiences growing up in the neighborhood during the 1980s, was filmed at various locations around Astoria.
 The Accidental Husband (2008), directed by Griffin Dunne, with Uma Thurman, Colin Firth and Jeffrey Dean Morgan was filmed in Astoria on 33rd Street and 23rd Avenue.
 The remake of the comedy film Arthur (2011) depicts at least one scene showing Astoria, Queens, using a Batmobile visual shown from 34th Street and 34th Avenue in the neighborhood.
 People Places Things (2015) by James C. Strouse was filmed at several locations in Astoria, including Astoria Park; the protagonist, played by Jemaine Clement, is described as living in Astoria.

Gaming
 The video game Grand Theft Auto IV—which takes place in a mock New York City named Liberty City—has a neighborhood named Steinway in the borough of Dukes, the counterpart of Queens in the game. The game features a Bohemian Hall-inspired "Steinway Beer Garden", but as an Irish-and-German themed bar instead of Czech. (A mock TV commercial for the Steinway Beer Garden, viewable at the Rockstar website, includes the voice-over remarking that the Garden is "ethnically confused.") Steinway Park is modeled after Astoria Park, with its famous outdoor pool (including the diving platforms) and scenic water's-edge pathway. Numerous signs and awnings of real local Astoria businesses appear in the game, although the names have been altered (e.g. "ASTORIA Medical Dental" becomes "ROSARIA Medical Dental").
 The video game The Godfather II depicts Astoria in its version of New York City.

Literature
 In F. Scott Fitzgerald's novel The Great Gatsby (1925), Jay Gatsby is pulled over by a policeman on a "motor cycle" in Astoria while driving with the narrator into the city.
 Astoria is the setting for Dito Montiel's memoir, A Guide to Recognizing Your Saints (2001), later made into a 2006 film.
 Astoria is the setting for the novel Autobiography/Masquerade (2006), written to honor the memory of Antonio "Nino" Pellegrino, an Astoria native who appeared briefly in A Bronx Tale.
 In Ayn Rand's novel The Fountainhead (1943), lead character Howard Roark destroys the Cortlandt Homes housing project which is located on the East River in Astoria.

Music
 Sufjan Stevens recorded a majority of Illinoise at The Buddy Project Recording Studio in Astoria.
 Rapper Action Bronson filmed his music video "Strictly 4 My Jeeps" in Astoria. The video was released on May 20, 2013, as the single for his album Saaab Stories.
 Queens Metal band Emmure released a track on their 3rd studio album Felony titled "Bars in Astoria". It was featured on the Ibanez website in their interview with members of the band in promotion of their product.
 The music video for the song "Your Love" (1985) by the British band The Outfield was set in a sound stage/painting studio in the rear of what is currently Strand Pharmacy at 25-01 Broadway. At the end of the video, the female "painter" walks out of the sound stage onto Crescent St. and then makes a left onto Broadway.

Television
 The 1970s situation comedy All in the Family was set in Astoria, although the address given for Archie Bunker's home (704 Hauser Street) is fictional, and the exterior of the house shown in the opening credits was shot elsewhere in Queens.
 The television series Cosby, starring Bill Cosby, Phylicia Rashad and Madeleine Kahn (not to be confused with the earlier series The Cosby Show) was set in Astoria and was filmed there, at the Kaufman Astoria Studios on 35th Avenue.
 The Showtime original series Nurse Jackie is shot at Kaufman Astoria Studios as well as on location in Astoria.
 The Netflix original series Orange Is the New Black is shot at Kaufman Astoria Studios as well as on location in Astoria.
 The block of 37th Street between Ditmars Boulevard and 23rd Avenue is sometimes referred to as "the Seinfeld Street." In the Seinfeld television show, this street is occasionally seen in external establishing shots as the block where George Costanza's parents live.
 Kaufman Astoria Studios has further been longtime host to the PBS series Sesame Street and has been credited with local shoots on films like The Stepford Wives, the 2009 remake of The Taking of Pelham 123, and the Golden Globe-winning Angels in America.
 The character Abbi Abrams from Broad City lives in Astoria.

References

External links
 
 

 
Albanian-American culture in New York City
Arab-American culture in New York City
Astor family
Egyptian-American culture in New York City
Former villages in New York City
Greek-American culture in New York City
Greektowns in the United States
Neighborhoods in Queens, New York
Populated coastal places in New York (state)